Rate of flow may refer to:

 Mass flow rate, the movement of mass per time
 Volumetric flow rate, the volume of a fluid which passes through a given surface per unit of time
 Heat flow rate, the movement of heat per time

Flow